Craig Redding Baxley (born October 20, 1949) is an American director, stunt coordinator, stunt performer and occasional actor. He is best known for his work in the action and thriller genres.

Beginning his career as a stunt performer, he was hired to perform stunts in number of notable television series namely Police Story, Harry O, Rich Man, Poor Man Book II, Gemini Man, Roots and M*A*S*H.
He worked as stunt coordinator and second unit director on The Dukes of Hazzard and The A-Team (on which he later made his directorial debut),  along with the pilot of Hunter as second unit director. He was stunt coordinator on the feature films The Warriors (1979) and The Long Riders (1980), as well as second unit director on Reds (1981) and Predator (1987).

Baxley also appeared in four episodes of Kolchak: The Night Stalker, as well having small roles in Chase, Mannix, Bearcats!, Marcus Welby, M.D. and S.W.A.T.

In 1988, he made his feature film directorial debut with Action Jackson. His other feature film credits are I Come in Peace (1990), Stone Cold (1991) and Sniper 2 (2002).

Baxley's other television directing credits include miniseries based on Stephen King works namely Storm of the Century (1999), Rose Red (2002), The Diary of Ellen Rimbauer (2003), Kingdom Hospital (2004), as well as The Triangle (2005) and The Lost Room (2006). Some of his television film credits include A Family Torn Apart (1993), Twisted Desire (1996) and Silencing Mary (1998) both starring Melissa Joan Hart.

References

External links

1949 births
American male film actors
American stunt performers
American male television actors
American television directors
Living people
Film directors from Los Angeles
Male actors from California
Male actors from Los Angeles
Action film directors